Khuzama is a Southern Angami  Naga village on the inter-state border with Manipur located 28 km south of Kohima, the capital of Nagaland.

Demographics
Khuzama is situated in Jakhama circle of Kohima District in Nagaland. As per the Population Census 2011, there are total 970 families residing in Khuzama. The total population of Khuzama is 5,216.

See also
Southern Angami
Angami Naga
Chakhesang Naga

References

Cities and towns in Kohima district